Labeobarbus robertsi is a species of ray-finned fish in the genus Labeobarbus is endemic to the Inkisi River in the Democratic Republic of the Congo.

References 

robertsi
Taxa named by Keith Edward Banister
Fish described in 1984
Endemic fauna of the Democratic Republic of the Congo